Maharani Datar Kaur (born Bibi Raj Kaur Nakai;  (c. 1784– 20 June 1838) was the queen consort of Maharaja Ranjit Singh, the founder of the Sikh Empire and the mother of his successor, Maharaja Kharak Singh. She was the daughter of Sardar Ran Singh Nakai, third ruler of the Nakai Misl and Sardarni Karmo Kaur.

Datar Kaur was betrothed to Ranjit Singh in childhood; the Anand Karaj took place when the couple were still young. Though Ranjit Singh married several times for political reasons, Datar Kaur remained his favorite and most respected wife. He lovingly addressed her as Mai Nakain.

In 1801, she gave birth to Kharak Singh, the heir apparent of Ranjit Singh. She took an active interest in the affairs of the State and was given command during the Battle of Multan (1818) alongside her son, Kharak Singh. She was the grandmother of Maharaja Nau Nihal Singh (1821–1840) and aunt of Sardar Kahan Singh Nakai. Datar Kaur died on 20 June 1838 in her haveli in Sheikhupura.

Her Samadhi is located in the royal garden, now part of the Islamia College, Civil Lines, Lahore grounds.

Family history 

Bibi Raj Kaur was born in Baherwal Kalan into the family of the ruling Nakai Sardars; Nakai Misl was founded by Sandhu Jats.

Raj Kaur was the youngest and the only daughter of Sardar Ran Singh Nakai and his wife, Sardarni Karmo Kaur. She was the granddaughter of Sardar Natha Singh (d. 1768) brother of the legendary Heera Singh Sandhu (1706-1767), founder of the principality of Nakai Misl in 1748. She had three eldest brothers Sardar Bhagwan Singh, the fourth ruler of the Nakai Misl; Sardar Gyan Singh who became the fifth chief of the Nakais and Khazan Singh.

Her father, Ran Singh was the third and the most powerful ruler of Nakai Misl, a fierce warrior and under his leadership the misl was at its highest. He was an ambitious man and had exceeded his rule to the taluqas of Bucheke, Chhanga Manga, 69 km from Lahore, Chhichha, Devsal, Fatahpur, Jethupur, Kasur, Kharral fort of Kot Kamalia, Sharakpur, Gugera pargana, 5 km to the west of the Ravi, and Shergarh. He had fought repeatedly against Kamar Singh, the ruler of Syedwala. Sometime before his death, he defeated him and captured Syedwala.

Ran Singh was succeeded by his eldest son Bhagwan Singh, he was unable to hold his territory against Wazir Singh, the brother of Kamar Singh and lost Syedwala to him. Bhagwan Singh realizing that he might lose all of his territory, in consultation with Sardarni Karmo Kaur, set up the engagement of the infant Raj Kaur to the four-year-old, Ranjit Singh in order to gain the powerful Maha Singh of the Sukerchakia Misl as an ally. Wazir Singh tried to break off this match, but was unable to do so. In an attempt to mislead her, Wazir Singh claimed that the Nakai Sandhu Jatts are superior to the Sukerchakias, but Sardarni Karmo Kaur refused to break off the match and stated as Sikhs we are all equal.

Later in 1785, Maha Singh was facing attacks from Sardar Jai Singh Kanhaiya of the Kanhaiya Misl and called on Bhagwan Singh and Wazir Singh to aid him. After their victory against the Kanhaiyas, Maha Singh began to favor Wazir Singh, which started to affect his relationship with Bhagwan Singh. Maha Singh tired to reconcile the differences between Bhagwan Singh and Wazir Singh, but they continued to engage in constant warfare and in 1789 he was killed by Wazir Singh.

Since Bhagwan Singh had no children, he was succeeded by his brother, Gyan Singh as the head of the Nakai Misl in 1789. With the family's old enemy Wazir Singh being killed by Dal Singh, son of Heera Singh Sandhu, Gyan Singh had a relatively peaceful reign and was able to consolidate his power.

Marriage 
Ranjit Singh sought for Raj Kaur Nakain's hand in marriage- as they were betrothed for quite some time. He wanted to unite the Sikh Misls and consolidate his position as the head of the Sukerchakia Misl, as well as to re-establish Nakai and Sukerchakia relations.

Gyan Singh agreed for the nuptials of Raj Kaur and Ranjit Singh and the couple were wedded in 1792.
 She is said to be only 12 at the time of her muklawa to the 16-year-old Ranjit Singh in 1797. This marriage was the first political alliance of the Sukerchakia Misl and the Nakai Misl.

Though the nuptials of Datar Kaur and Ranjit Singh were arranged for political reasons, the two shared a close and loving relationship. Her known physical and personal attributes describe her as being beautiful, vivacious, independent, artistic, and exceptionally intelligent. Since Raj Kaur was the name of her mother-in-law, as well as Ranjit Singh's aunt, Charat Singh and Desan Kaur's daughter; To avoid confusion, the wife of Ranjit Singh, Raj Kaur Nakai was given the name "Datar" (ਦਾਤਾਰ) (داتار) which means 'Giver', due to her maternal gentleness and understanding in dealing with the wayward Ranjit Singh. He lovingly called Mai Nakain,  sometimes affectionately addressed her as Taare. Datar Kaur brought sweetness and light into Ranjit Singh's life and provided for him a focus of interest in his home. Even though Ranjit Singh had many marriages, Datar Kaur remained his favourite.

She had significant influence over her husband, the royal family and the royal court.  There is no record of any friction or mutual differences between Datar Kaur or the other wives of Ranjit Singh, but there were instances of tension between her and Mehtab Kaur after the she bore Ranjit Singh's first child. This left Mehtab Kaur in a very difficult position as Datar was her junior. This also left Sada Kaur's plans to secure the future of her daughter and the Kanhaiyas in tatters. Ranjit Singh and Mehtab Kaur's marriage was strained due to Mehtab never being able to forgive that her father was killed in battle with Ranjit Singh's father; and she mainly resided in Batala with her mother.

In some historical accounts, mistakenly, marriage of Ranjit Singh has been mentioned with two daughters of Nakai Misl i.e. Raj Kaur and Datar Kaur. However, she was one and the same person.

Issue and descendants 
In 1801, she gave birth to Crown Prince Kharak Singh, the heir apparent of the Sikh Empire earning her the title of Ranjit Singh's queen consort.

According to the pedigree table of the Lahore Royal Family she bore Ranjit Singh two other sons Rattan Singh and Fateh Singh, who passed away in infancy. 

In 2020, Sandeep Singh Sukerchakia, 7th generation great-grandson of Maharaja Ranjit Singh and Maharani Datar Kaur from their son Rattan Singh, wrote a detailed letter to Narendra Modi, the Prime Minister of India insisting the inclusion of Punjabi Language in the New Jammu and Kashmir official Language Bill of 2020.

Her other descendants include- Late Lt Gen Jagdishwar Singh Nakai who joined the Indian army just when the Second World War broke out and served in the Burma Campaign. He was later to see action in all subsequent wars of independent India till his retirement in 1979 after serving as the General Officer in Command, Central Command. Lt Gen Nakai was a recipient of the Param Vishisht Seva Medal. Former Chief Minister of Punjab (Pakistan), Sardar Arif Nakai and Pakistani politician, Sardar Asif Nakai are also the direct descendants of the Nakais.

Maharani of the Sikh Empire 

Datar Kaur took interest in political affairs, and her husband sought her advised in important stately matters. Even though she was his second wife she became his principal wife and chief consort. On many different occasions, she served as her husband's ambassador; even acting as a political proxy for him.

Mai Nakain took control of the Sheikhupura Fort when her six-year-old son, Kharak Singh had conquered it. In 1811, she was officially granted the jagir of Sheikhupura by Maharaja Ranjit Singh. Around the same time she started residing in the Sheikhupura Fort and held her own court. She enjoyed hunting and often accompanied her husband on his hunting trips. Sheikhupura has a vicinity of good hunting places.

In 1816, she took over her son's training for 18 months for his Expedition of Multan. Since his birth, her son was the heir of Ranjit Singh. But Sada Kaur only viewed him as heir presumptive as her daughter, Mehtab Kaur was the first queen of Ranjit Singh. However, in 1816, to put an end to all intrigues Ranjit Singh officially announced Kharak Singh as his heir apparent and anointed him "Tikka Kanwar" (Crown prince).

Mai Nakkain was a brave woman and In 1818, she accompanied her son as a fellow commander to Multan. The Sikh Khalsa Army was under her command during the Battle of Multan (1818). She played a considerable role in popularizing handicrafts like Phulkari knitting and fine arts in Punjab. Mai Nakain was also a patron of religious mystics and mendicants.

Sukerchakia-Nakai relationship 
Even though his favourite Rani was from the house of the Nakais, Ranjit Singh's relationship with the Nakais was somewhat rocky. Nakais did not find the alliance with Ranjit Singh much useful to them.

After Ranjit Singh had declared himself the Maharaja of Punjab in 1801 he had kept consolidating majority of the Misls. The ambitious Maharaja had been eyeing the Nakai territory, but had spared it till the death of Sardar Gyan Singh in 1807. But soon after suggested Sardar Kahan Singh Nakai, who succeeded his father as the sixth chief of the Nakais to join the Lahore Darbar, which the proud newly crowned Nakai chief steadily refused to obligate. Finally, in 1811, Ranjit Singh sent Kharak Singh to annex all the Nakai territories; Sardar Kahan Singh came back from Multan to find his cousin Kharak Singh has taken over his misl. Diwan Hakim Rai, the administer of the Nakai Chief, immediately approached Ranjit Singh with the request that it was not proper for the Lahore forces to take military action against his nephew's misl. Sohan Lai Suri notes that the Maharaja, very poliety, said "I have nothing to do in this matter, Kunwar Kharak Singh is the maternal grandson of the Nakais and only he knows as to what is to be done."

Before having his estates seized Kahan Singh was successful in conquering Pakpattan. Ranjit Singh granted Kahan Singh jagir at Baherwal while his brother-in-law, Khazan Singh was granted a jagir at Nankot. Sardar Kahan Singh continued to live in Baharwal and the Nakais remained loyal to Maharaja Ranjit Singh.

Death
Datar Kaur died in Sheikhupura on June 20, 1838. Sohan Lal Suri in Umdat-ut-Tawarikh, writes that both the Maharaja and Maharani returned from a hunting trip to Sheikhupura and fell ill. While Ranjit recovered, she died. Kharak Singh was inconsolable by the death of his mother. The Royal Lahore Garden was chosen for her Samadhi, the site was chosen by Ranjit himself and Suri mentions for the first time he saw the Maharaja cry. Ranjit Singh wanted the finest for his wife, hence the Royal Garden was chosen and the ashes of Mai Nakain were placed.  It is also the resting place of her daughter-in-law, Maharani Chand Kaur and grand daughter-in-law, Sahib Kaur wife of Nau Nihal Singh. Today the site has become part of Islamia College, Civil Lines, Lahore grounds.

Claude Martin Wade had brought the Tripartite Treaty of 1838 to be signed at her funeral.

In popular culture

 Datar Kaur was a portrayed by Navneet Cheema in the TV series titled Maharaja Ranjit Singh which aired on DD National. The series was produced by Raj Babbar.
Datar Kaur is a principal character in Chitra Banerjee Divakaruni's The Last Queen.

See also
 Misl 
 Misl Nakai
Sardar Ran Singh Nakai
 Maharaja Ranjit Singh
 Sikh Empire
Sardar Heera Singh Sandhu
Maharaja Kharak Singh

References

Notes
 Suri, Sohan Lal, Umddt ut-Twarikh. Lahore, 1885–89.
 Ganda Singh, ed., Maharaja Ranjit Singh (First Death Centenary Memorial Volume)

Punjabi people
1780s births
1838 deaths
Year of birth uncertain
Indian Sikhs
Indian female royalty
Women of the Sikh Empire
18th-century Indian women
18th-century Indian people